János Garay (23 February 1889 – 21 April 1945) was a Hungarian fencer, and one of the best sabre fencers in the world in the 1920s.

Personal
Garay had two children: Jànos, a water polo player and Mària, a swimmer. He was also father-in-law to Valéria Gyenge.

Fencing career

Hungarian Championship

Garay was the Hungarian national sabre champion in 1923.

European and World Championships

In 1925 and 1930, Garay captured the Individual European Sabre Championship gold medal.  He won the team sabre gold medal at the 1930 European Championships.

Olympics

He won silver medal for team saber at the 1924 Paris Olympics.

He also won a gold medal in team saber at the 1928 Amsterdam Games.

Concentration Camp and Death

He was one of 437,000 Jews deported from Hungary to a concentration camp after Germany occupied the country in 1944.

Garay was killed shortly thereafter, in 1945, in the Mauthausen concentration camp in Austria, shortly before the end of World War II.

Hall of Fame

Garay, who was Jewish, was inducted in 1990 into The International Jewish Sports Hall of Fame, Wingate Institute, Netanya, Israel.

See also
 List of select Jewish fencers

References

External links
 
 Holocaust Museum bio
 Jewish Sports bio
 Jews in Sports bio
 Jewish Sports Legends bio
 "Jewish Olympic Champions; Victims of the Holocaust
 "The Olympics and the Holocaust," 2004
 "The Nazi Olympics"
 "The Nazi Olympic Victims"

1889 births
1945 deaths
Hungarian male sabre fencers
Jewish male sabre fencers
Jewish Hungarian sportspeople
Olympic fencers of Hungary
Fencers at the 1924 Summer Olympics
Fencers at the 1928 Summer Olympics
Olympic gold medalists for Hungary
Olympic silver medalists for Hungary
Olympic bronze medalists for Hungary
Olympic medalists in fencing
Hungarian people who died in Mauthausen concentration camp
Austro-Hungarian Army officers
Austro-Hungarian military personnel of World War I
International Jewish Sports Hall of Fame inductees
Medalists at the 1924 Summer Olympics
Medalists at the 1928 Summer Olympics
Hungarian people executed in Nazi concentration camps
Hungarian Jews who died in the Holocaust
Fencers from Budapest